Petar Kirov (born September 17, 1942) is a former  Greco Roman wrestler from Bulgaria.

He was born in Kalchevo, Yambol province.

He is an Olympic gold winner from the games in  Mexico 1968 and Munich 1972, three times champion of the World and four times champion of Europe.

External links
profile

1942 births
Living people
Olympic wrestlers of Bulgaria
Wrestlers at the 1968 Summer Olympics
Wrestlers at the 1972 Summer Olympics
Wrestlers at the 1976 Summer Olympics
Bulgarian male sport wrestlers
Olympic gold medalists for Bulgaria
Olympic medalists in wrestling
People from Yambol Province
Medalists at the 1972 Summer Olympics
Medalists at the 1968 Summer Olympics
20th-century Bulgarian people
21st-century Bulgarian people